Housekeeping is the act of cleaning the rooms and furnishings of a home.

Housekeeping may also refer to:

Homes and buildings
 Homemaking, a mainly American term for the management of a home
 Housekeeper (domestic worker), an individual responsible for the cleaning and maintenance of the interior of a residence
 Janitor, a professional who takes care of institutional buildings

Entertainment
 Housekeeping, a 2001 film by Janeane Garofalo
 Housekeeping (novel), a 1980 novel by Marilynne Robinson
 Housekeeping (film), a 1987 adaptation of the novel, starring Christine Lahti
 "Housekeeping" (NCIS), an episode of NCIS

Biology
 Housekeeping gene, a gene which maintains basic cellular functions

Technology
 Housekeeping (computing), several types of maintenance routines or processes 
 Maintenance, repair, and operations, or "housekeeping", in the context of spacecraft operations and other fields

See also
 
 Housekeeper (disambiguation)